Kulamavu Saddle Dam (Near Junction) is one of the two saddle dams of Idukki Reservoir constructed across Kilivallithodu  River which is a tributary of Periyar river at Arakkulam village in Idukki District of Kerala, India. The road to Idukki from Thodupuzha passes over this saddle dam.

Specifications

Location	Latitude:9⁰48’5”N
Longitude:76⁰53’E	Dam Features
Panchayath	Arakkulam	
Classification	MH- Medium Height
Village	Arakkulam	
Maximum Water Level (MWL)	EL 2408.50 ft. ( 734.30 m)
District	Idukki	
River Basin	Periyar	
River	Kilivallithodu	
Release from Dam to river	NA
Year of completion	1977
Name of Project	Idukki HEP
Purpose of Project	Hydro Power
Type of Dam	Rolled earth fill
Full Reservoir Level ( FRL)	EL 2403.00 ft. ( 732.62 m) 
Storage at FRL	1996.30 Mm3
Height from deepest foundation	
Length	
Spillway	No spillway
Crest Level	NA
River Outlet	NA
Officers in charge & phone No.	Executive Engineer, Dam Safety Division No. II, Vazhathope, Idukki (Dist.), Kerala, PIN- 685602 Phone- 9446008425
Assistant Executive Engineer, Dam Safety Sub Division, Vazhathope, Idukki ( Dist.), Kerala, PNI-685602 Phone-9496011961
Installed capacity of the Project	780 MW	
Project Identification Code ( PIC)	KL29HH0059

References

Dams in Kerala
Dams completed in 1977
20th-century architecture in India